Gabile.com is a website managed from Istanbul which provides an online LGBT community by services such as dating, chatting and sexual advice. As of 2013, it was Turkey's largest gay dating portal and LGBT social network. The organization was founded in 1999. It allows profile creation on the website, online chat and gives away information and news related to LGBT events, alongside photos, personal writings made available to people with all different sexual orientations. In 2009, there were 225,000 registered users from Turkey using the website. Four different membership types or preference are available for people who utilize the service: users, contacts, clubs and escorts, The website is available in 4 different languages and covers topics related to different sexual orientations, including active gay, passive gay, AP gay, lesbian, bisexual male, bisexual female, transvestite, and transgender Many artists, including Seyhan Arman, have worked as a columnist for the website. The organization works in partnership with Shemaleturk.com, a website exclusive to gay and transgender people. On the radio channel Radyo Gabile, many celebrities including Sibel Tüzün, Yonca Evcimik, Zeynep, Aydın, and Vj Bülent, have participated as guests. Gabile is also the owner of a gay bar in Taksim Square called Club Otherway.

Background 
The website has been active since 1999, founded by Can under the pseudonym "Eskuel" and Tamer under the pseudonym "Eriss".

Content 
The +18 option is located next to the Gabile emblem on the website. Members cannot upload pictures that may have pornographic nature or create pornographic perception, nor can they have sexual correspondence. The membership agreement states that individuals under the age of 18 cannot be members. Also on the website it specifically mentions things such as pornography, users under the age of 18, slang, and inappropriate behavior are prohibited.

Censorship  
Gabile.com was blocked in Turkey and made inaccessible following the Presidency of Telecommunication and Communication's (BTK) decision to take administrative measures on the grounds that "the photos of members in swimsuits are encouraging prostitution" and "promoting it". Following the block of the website, in the news section of the Gabile.com website's main page a statement was made available:

After the block by BTK, the world press described the incident as a scandal. The initiative of the Amsterdam Homoloket LGBTQ families and its related institutes announced that they had found the decision "homophobic" by publishing a protest letter. In the written statement made by the Information and Communication Technologies Authority following the censorship, BTK announced "that they removed the offensive content from the Internet sites and took the necessary measures to prevent these contents from appearing on other sites." In the same statement, it was clarified that the block had been lifted following technical investigations and reviewing the contents thoroughly.

See also 
 Homosocialization

References

External links
 Gabile.com
 Gabile Radio

Same sex online dating
LGBT social networking services
LGBT organizations in Turkey
Online dating services of Turkey